Max Llovera González-Adrio (born 8 January 1997) is an Andorran professional footballer who plays as a central defender for Spanish club CP San Cristóbal.

Career

FC Santboià
On 20 December 2018 FC Santboià confirmed, that Llovera had signed for the club.

International career

Llovera debuted for Andorra on 3 September 2015.

International goals
Scores and results list Austria's goal tally first, score column indicates score after each Llovera goal.

References

External links

1997 births
Living people
Andorran people of Spanish descent
Andorran people of German descent
Andorran footballers
Association football defenders
Segunda División B players
Lleida Esportiu footballers
Andorra international footballers
Andorra youth international footballers
Andorran expatriate footballers
Andorran expatriate sportspeople in Spain
UA Horta players
FC Santboià players
EC Granollers players